The antiseptic douche was one of the most popular forms of birth control in the early 1900s. It was similar in function to the conventional vaginal douche, but was filled with a chemical mixture instead of saline. The purpose of using a chemical mixture was to interrupt the path of sperm and stop a woman from getting pregnant.  Family sizes in the previous generations  had always been large, with many women having six or more children. Frequent miscarriages and many deaths were also common before modern medicine.  For these women, being given the hope that there was a reasonably priced and safe alternative to countless pregnancies gave many women something they had never had in the past: control of their bodies and in turn their lives.

Comstock laws 
The Comstock laws, passed in 1873, made the sale and advertisement of birth control information illegal.  While the Comstock laws encompassed anything considered obscene, literature and information relating to pregnancy and birth control was very heavily affected, which prevented women from being able to obtain accurate information regarding feminine health.  “It is a crime for anyone, even for the best of reasons and in the greatest need to send or to receive by mail anything that tells ‘where, how or of whom’ information may be secured as to how conception may be controlled.”  Even though information could not be advertised, companies found loopholes in the laws. For instance, the packaging of birth control products could not say, “to prevent pregnancy,” but could say to, “manage feminine health.”  However, women knew that managing feminine health meant pregnancy prevention, and these products flew off the shelves.  As a result of this strategic advertising, an entirely new space in the consumer market was created for birth control products practically overnight.  These products, the most successful of which was the antiseptic douche, were sold in catalogs, grocery stores, department stores, and even door to door.

Success rate in preventing unwanted pregnancy 
“This class of case is so common that I feel like apologizing for referring to it... [she] had given birth to five children... And the fear of another pregnancy became an obsession to her.”  Women were desperate and would go to great lengths to prevent an unwanted pregnancy.  The antiseptic douche, in fact, had one of the lowest success rates, somewhere around 20-30%.  The majority of women who used the douche often found themselves pregnant in the long run.  However, regardless of the high failure rate, demand was high. Because the products could not be advertised as birth control products, the companies were not responsible to communicate the success rate or the health risks associated with using an antiseptic douche.  “Clamoring for a larger share of the hygiene market, manufactures did their utmost to ensure their product would be one women would want to try.”  Later research actually shows that douching can lead to pregnancy, in that the solution can push the sperm farther up into the body and into the cervix, or in most cases do nothing because even when used correctly and immediately after sexual intercourse, the sperm has already reached the egg.

Health risks 
Modern research shows douching is very unhealthy for a woman’s hygiene. It unbalances a woman’s pH, which is self-cleaning.   Many antiseptic douche products being sold at the time contained very strong chemicals, such as mercury, and packaging provided little information on how to reduce the effect of the chemicals. Many women felt that the stronger the mixture, the more likely it would be to prevent pregnancy, which increased the health risks. In addition to mercury, there were various other chemicals being used as birth control, and these different solutions could result in burns to a woman’s vagina, ectopic pregnancies, and other serious effects that could potentially lead to hospitalization.

Decline in use of antiseptic douching 
With the repeal of the Comstock Act, the continued championing of Margaret Sanger, and the development of more reliable forms of birth control, the use of the antiseptic douche began to decline.  Over time more information was made available to women about the damaging effects of douching, spread by organizations such as Planned Parenthood.  With the repeal of the Comstock Act also brought about the development of the birth control pill, which revolutionized women's health.  The success rate and ease of new forms of birth control also influenced the decline in the reliance of antiseptic douching.

References 

Methods of birth control